Pesce may refer to:

Geography
 The Pesce Peninsula in West Antarctica

Cinema
 Il pesce innamorato (‘The Fish in Love’), Italian comedy film released in 1999

People
 Brett Pesce (born 1994), American hockey player
 Emidio Pesce (born 2002), Italian racing driver
 Frank Pesce (1946–2022), American actor
 Giovanni Pesce (1918–2007), Italian anti-fascist partisan who fought in the Spanish Civil War and World War II
 Mark Pesce (born 1962), co-inventor of VRML
Gaetano Pesce (born 1939), Italian sculptor
Mattia Pesce (born 1989), Italian swimmer
 P. J. Pesce (born 1961), American film director and writer
Simone Pesce (born 1982), Italian football player
Stefano Pesce (born 1967), Italian actor
Vincenzo Pesce (born 1959), Italian gangster of the Pesce 'ndrina

Educational Institutes
 P.E.S. College of Engineering, an engineering college in Mandya, India

Italian-language surnames